Seinonella is a Gram-positive and aerobic bacterial genus from the family of Thermoactinomycetaceae. Up to now there is only one species of this genus known (Seinonella peptonophila).

References

Further reading 
 

Bacillales
Bacteria genera
Monotypic bacteria genera